The 1915 Davidson football team was an American football team that represented the Davidson College as an independent during the 1915 college football season. In their first year under head coach Bill Fetzer, the team compiled a 4–3–1 record.

Schedule

References

Davidson
Davidson Wildcats football seasons
Davidson football